Douglas Long Saunders (born December 13, 1969) is an American former professional baseball player. Saunders played for the New York Mets of Major League Baseball (MLB) in the 1993 season. In 28 games, Saunders had 14 hits in 67 at-bats, with a .209 batting average. He has 4 brothers, Dennis, Eric, Barry and Keith.

References

External links

1969 births
Living people
American expatriate baseball players in Canada
Baseball players from California
Binghamton Mets players
Columbia Mets players
Edmonton Trappers players
Gulf Coast Mets players
Little Falls Mets players
Major League Baseball second basemen
Major League Baseball shortstops
Major League Baseball third basemen
Memphis Chicks players
New York Mets players
Norfolk Tides players
People from Yorba Linda, California
Port City Roosters players
St. Lucie Mets players
Tacoma Rainiers players